Wendland is a region in Germany on the borders of the present states of Brandenburg, Mecklenburg-Western Pomerania, Lower Saxony and Saxony-Anhalt.

Wendland may also refer to:

Places
 in a medieval sense, the Wendland means any West Slavic, or Wendish, region not designated as Polish, Bohemian or Moravian
in the Middle Ages, Pomerania and the surrounding areas were called Wendland, Vendland, Vindland, Ventheland or  
Hanoverian Wendland is the heart of the Wendland region, today covered by the county of Lüchow-Dannenberg in the German state of Lower Saxony
Free Republic of Wendland was a protest camp established in Gorleben in the Wendland region of Germany in 1980
according to the Finnish historian Matti Klinge, an earlier name for Finland
Mount Wendland, Antarctic mountain

Other uses
Wendland (surname)
Wendland v. Wendland